Dihydroxybiphenyl (as known as biphenol) may refer to:

 2,2'-Dihydroxybiphenyl
 2,3'-Dihydroxybiphenyl
 2,4'-Dihydroxybiphenyl
 3,3'-Dihydroxybiphenyl
 3,4'-Dihydroxybiphenyl
 4,4'-Dihydroxybiphenyl